Events in the year 2009 in Germany.

Incumbents

Federal level
President – Horst Köhler
Chancellor – Angela Merkel

State level
Minister-President of Baden-Württemberg – Günther Oettinger
Minister-President of Bavaria – Horst Seehofer
Governing mayor of Berlin – Klaus Wowereit
First mayor of Bremen – Jens Böhrnsen
Minister-President of Brandenburg – Matthias Platzeck
First mayor of Hamburg – Ole von Beust
Minister-President of Hesse – Roland Koch
Minister-President of Lower Saxony – Christian Wulff
Minister-President of Mecklenburg-Vorpommern – Erwin Sellering
Minister-President of North Rhine-Westphalia – Jürgen Rüttgers
Minister-President of Rhineland-Palatinate – Kurt Beck
Minister-President of the Saarland – Peter Müller
Minister-President of Saxony – Stanislaw Tillich
Minister-President of Saxony-Anhalt – Wolfgang Böhmer
Minister-President of Schleswig-Holstein – Peter Harry Carstensen
Minister-President of Thuringia – Dieter Althaus

Events
 15 January - Germany presses Moscow and Kyiv to end the Russian gas crisis.
 5–15 February - 59th Berlin International Film Festival
 9 February - Germany in the Eurovision Song Contest 2009
 March - The Volkswagen Polo Mk5 is launched at the Geneva Motor Show and was voted European Car of the Year eight months later.
 11 March - A 17-year-old former student goes on a rampage at his former school in Winnenden, Germany, killing at least fifteen people, before turning the gun on himself.
 23 May - 2009 German presidential election
 15–23 August - 2009 World Championships in Athletics takes place in Berlin. Usain Bolt breaks the world records for 200 metres and 100 metres.
 30 August - 2009 Saarland state election, 2009 Saxony state election and 2009 Thuringia state election take place
 September - Opel launches new Astra at Frankfurt Motor Show.
 27 September - 2009 German federal election takes place. Angela Merkel wins reelection as chancellor.
 27 September - 2009 Schleswig-Holstein state election and 2009 Brandenburg state election take place.
 28 October - German bishop Margot Käßmann becomes first elected woman as leader of Evangelical Church in Germany.
 28 October - The Second Merkel cabinet led by Angela Merkel was sworn in.
 30 October - Christine Lieberknecht (CDU) becomes Minister-President of state Thuringia.
 27 November - Wolfgang Schneiderhan, the Chief of Staff of the German Bundeswehr, and Franz Josef Jung resign over allegations that they withheld information in the aftermath of the Kunduz airstrike.
 30 November - Ursula von der Leyen becomes Federal Ministry of Labour and Social Affairs (Germany) and Kristina Köhler becomes new Federal Ministry of Family Affairs, Senior Citizens, Women and Youth
 December - Dresdner Bank was acquired by German Commerzbank.

Deaths 

 5 January - Adolf Merckle, industrialist (born 1934)
 2 March - Ernst Benda, politician (born 1925)
 28 March - Helmut Noller, Olympic sprint canoer (born 1919)
 4 May - Gisela Stein, German actress (born 1935)
 13 May - Monica Bleibtreu, German actress (born 1944)
 23 May - Barbara Rudnik, actress (born 1958)
 9 June - Karl Michael Vogler, actor (born 1928)
 17 June - Ralf Dahrendorf, sociologist and politician (born 1929)
 19 June - Joerg Hube, actor (born 1943)
 30 June - Pina Bausch, choreographer and dancer (born 1940)
 30 July - Peter Zadek, theatre and film director (born 1926)
 31 July - Ilona Christen, journalist (born 1951)
 18 August - Hildegard Behrens, opera singer (born 1937)
 22 August - Horst E. Brandt, film director (born 1923)
 19 September - Eduard Zimmermann, journalist (born 1929)
 3 October - Reinhard Mohn, businessman (born 1921)
 4 October - Guenther Rall, fighter pilot (born 1918)
 6 October - Werner Maihofer, jurist and legal philosopher (born 1918)
 9 October - Horst Szymaniak, footballer (born 1934)
 19 October - Dietrich von Bothmer, art historian (born 1918)
 10 November - Robert Enke, footballer (born 1977)
 15 November - Hans Matthöfer, German politician (born 1925)
 27 November - Erich Böhme, journalist (born  1930)
 5 December - Otto Graf Lambsdorff, German politician of the Free Democratic Party (born 1926)
 23 December - Rainer Zepperitz, German double bassist (born 1930)

See also 
 2009 in German television

References 

 
Years of the 21st century in Germany